Ro-37 was an Imperial Japanese Navy Kaichū type submarine of the K6 sub-class. Completed and commissioned in June 1943, she served in World War II and was sunk during her second war patrol in January 1944.

Design and description
The submarines of the K6 sub-class were versions of the preceding K5 sub-class with greater range and diving depth. They displaced  surfaced and  submerged.

For surface running, the boats were powered by two  diesel engines, each driving one propeller shaft. When submerged each propeller was driven by a  electric motor. They could reach  on the surface and  underwater.

The boats were armed with four internal bow  torpedo tubes and carried a total of ten torpedoes. They were also armed with a single  L/40 anti-aircraft gun and two single  AA guns.

Construction and commissioning

Ro-37 was laid down as Submarine No. 203 on 9 October 1941 by the Sasebo Navy Yard at Sasebo, Japan. She was renamed Ro-37 on 20 June 1942, and was provisionally attached to the Maizuru Naval District that day. She was launched on 30 June 1942 and completed and commissioned a year later on 30 June 1943.

Service history

Upon commissioning, Ro-37 was attached formally to the Maizuru Naval District and assigned to Submarine Squadron 11 for workups. On 16 September 1943 she was reassigned directly to 6th Fleet headquarters, and she departed Maizuru bound for Truk on 22 September 1943. During her voyage, she was reassigned to Submarine Division 1 in the 6th Fleet on 24 September 1943. She arrived at Truk on 7 October 1943.

First war patrol 
Ro-37 got underway from Truk on 20 October 1943 to begin her first war patrol, assigned a patrol area east of the New Hebrides as part of Submarine Group A. While at sea, she was reassigned to Submarine Division 34 on 31 October 1943, but otherwise her patrol was uneventful. She returned to Truk in November 1943.

Second war patrol

During the second half of December 1943, Ro-37 took aboard supplies from the auxiliary submarine tender  at Truk. On 2 January 1944, Fleet Radio Unit, Melbourne (FRUMEL), an Allied signals intelligence unit headquartered at Melbourne, Australia, reported that a Japanese message transmitted from Truk that FRUMEL had intercepted and decrypted said that Ro-37 was scheduled to depart Truk Lagoon via the South Channel at 16:00 on 3 January 1944 and proceed east-southeast on a course of 116 degrees. As FRUMEL had reported, Ro-37 got underway from Truk on 3 January 1944 on her second war patrol, bound for a patrol area off the New Hebrides. The Japanese never heard from her again.

Loss
The explosion opened holes in three of Cache′s oil tanks, damaged other tanks, and blew two men overboard, killing one of them. Southard rescued the other man from the water.

Meanwhile, Cache transmitted a distress signal, which the destroyer  — which was on a voyage from Purvis Bay to Espiritu Santo — received. Buchanan put on flank speed to go to Cache′s assistance. Buchanan′s crew observed an oil slick covering  on the surface, and the following morning a large amount of wooden and cork debris was seen floating in the vicinity of the sinking.

On 17 February 1944, the Imperial Japanese Navy declared Ro-37 to be presumed lost in the New Hebrides area with all 61 hands. She was stricken from the Navy list on 30 April 1944.

Notes

References
 

 

Ro-35-class submarines
Kaichū type submarines
Ships built by Sasebo Naval Arsenal
1942 ships
World War II submarines of Japan
Japanese submarines lost during World War II
World War II shipwrecks in the Pacific Ocean
Maritime incidents in January 1944
Submarines sunk by United States warships
Ships lost with all hands